Pachalam is a region in the city of Kochi in Kerala, India. Goshree bridge road at Marine Drive side ends at Pachalam. Pachalam can also be reached by Chittoor Road. Mulavukad island is on its west, Vaduthala and Chittoor island is on its north, Elamakkara at north east, Mamagalam and Palarivattom is on its east, Kaloor on southeast. It is also located between Marine Drive, Kaloor and Edapally acting as a connecting link between the most important places in Kochi. One of the main attractions near Pachalam is the famous Queen's Walkway, that connects Pachalam to the Gosree bridge Road and to Marine Drive. Although the roads are very narrow (except for the wide Pottakuzhy Road which is badly maintained), the traffic has increased, as roads inside Pachalam give a much needed respite to motorists who were looking an alternative to escape from the hardships of motoring through Banerjee Road especially during this phase of Kochi Metro construction.

A Kerala Institute of Tourism and Travel Studies (KITTS) study centre is located in Pachalam.

Location

Famous Landmarks In & Around Pachalam

Politics & Administration

Neighbourhood
Pachalam is the abode of many influential and up-class people, though recently it has seen an upsurge in migrants settling down especially in unauthorized, illegal buildings and makeshift arrangements in the area. Although the fewest illegal constructions i.e. 794 was reported from Pachalam division, it is a matter of concern. Although both sides of Pottakuzhy Road are residential areas, many illegal godowns don the area and trucks parked on both sides of the road, makes it immensely difficult for pedestrians and motorists. A prominent violation is the presence of an illegal dry fruits godown inside the famous "Link Park" residential colony in Pachalam. It fraudulently took license in the pretext of hostels and shops and is operating the building as a godown. RTI reply from the Corporation of Kochi clearly states that this godown is illegal yet the authorities refuse to take action for obvious/unknown reasons.

Link Park Colony, Anta Queen Gated Villas, Janatha Colony and other gated communities are some of the prominent residential locations in the area. The gold old departmental stores called "Padma Stores" is situated in Pachalam. "Virus" which was the biggest residential property in South India until a few years back is located very close to the famous Pottakuzhy Bridge.

References

Neighbourhoods in Kochi